The men's individual recurve competition at the 2002 Asian Games in Busan, South Korea was held from 6 to 9 October at the Gangseo Archery Field.

Schedule
All times are Korea Standard Time (UTC+09:00)

Results
Legend
DNS — Did not start

Qualification

Knockout round

Finals

Top half

Bottom half

References 

2002 Asian Games Report, Pages 250–252
Qualification Results
Final Results

External links
Official website

Men